Fauzal Mubaraq is an Indonesian goalkeeper. His height is 180 cm.

Honours

Club
Sriwijaya
Indonesian Community Shield (1): 2010
Indonesian Inter Island Cup (1): 2010

Bhayangkara

 Liga 1: 2017

References

External links

Indonesian footballers
Living people
1984 births
Sriwijaya F.C. players
PSPS Pekanbaru players
Persela Lamongan players
Liga 1 (Indonesia) players
Association football goalkeepers
Sportspeople from Riau